Nasir Khan Durrani (17 March 1957 – 19 April 2021) was a Pakistani police officer belonging to the 10th CTP who served in BPS-22 grade.

Biography
Durrani was highly regarded as an honest police officer in the country. In September 2013, he was appointed the Provincial Police Office (Inspector General of Police) of the Khyber Pakhtunkhwa thus making him top cop of the province, where he served till March 2017. As Inspector General of Police, Durrani oversaw all patrol and speciality units, and managed department policy that affected Khyber Pakhtunkhwa's many diverse communities. He was a Pashtun, belonging to Durrani tribe.

Durrani's tenure as chief of Khyber Pakhtunkhwa Police earned him fame and good repute since his policies were admired by the public. Showing his intellect, he managed to establish police specialised schools all over the province which has a vital part to play in raising the standards of policing. He was also credited as a pioneer of the safe city and rapid response projects of KPK police.

After winning the elections in 2018, Imran Khan shared in his first speech to the nation that he had asked Durrani to help improve the police standards of Punjab province. He was subsequently appointed the chairman of the Punjab Police Reform Commission in September 2018, where he served until October 2018.

Nasir Durrani died on 19 April 2021, in Mayo Hospital, Lahore of COVID-19.

References

Pakistani police officers
1957 births
2021 deaths
Pashtun people
IGPs of Khyber Pakhtunkhwa Police
Deaths from the COVID-19 pandemic in Pakistan